Bernard "BeeJay" Robert Lee Jr. (born March 5, 1993) is an American track and field sprinter who specializes in the 100 m and 200 m. He was a member of the USA team in the  relay at the 2017 World Championships in Athletics in London, UK. He ran in the winning semi-final, and received a silver medal after the team placed second in the final.

Biography

Early life
Beejay Lee grew up as one of five children of Bernard Lee and Karen Lee in the Californian city of West Covina. There he attended West Covina High School and participated in the athletics competitions.

College
After studying communication and journalism at the University of New Mexico, he joined the University of Southern California in 2013, running for the USC Trojans until his final season representing the school in 2015.

Professional track career
At the 2015 Pan American Games in Toronto, he finished sixth in 100 m, eighth in the 200 m, and won gold with the USA team in the  relay.

Statistics
Information from IAAF profile or Track & Field Results Reporting System unless otherwise noted.

Personal bests

Seasonal bests

100 m

200 m

International championship results

National championship results

Notes

References

External links

 (USC Trojans)
 (New Mexico Lobos)

1993 births
Living people
American male sprinters
World Athletics Championships athletes for the United States
World Athletics Championships medalists
Sportspeople from West Covina, California
Track and field athletes from California
Pan American Games medalists in athletics (track and field)
Pan American Games gold medalists for the United States
Athletes (track and field) at the 2015 Pan American Games
Medalists at the 2015 Pan American Games